The Swatch FIVB World Tour 2006 was the 2006 official international beach volleyball tour.

Grand Slam
There were four Grand Slam tournaments. These events give a higher number of points and more money than the rest of the tournaments.

Gstaad, SwitzerlandGrand Slam, June 20–25, 2006
Stavanger, NorwayGrand Slam, June 27 - July 2, 2006
Paris, FranceGrand Slam, July 25–30, 2006
Klagenfurt, AustriaGrand Slam, August 2–6, 2006

Tournament results

Women

Men

Medal table by country

References

External links
2006 Swatch FIVB World Tour - tour calendar at FIVB.org

 

2006 in beach volleyball
2006